CAMRA or the Campaign for Real Ale is a British organisation promoting traditional beer.

CAMRA may also refer to:
 Canberra Academy of Music and Related Arts, an Australian community music and theatre organisation
 CAMRa or Chilbolton Advanced Meteorological Radar
 Center for Advancing Microbial Risk Assessment, one of the United States Homeland Security Centers of Excellence mounton

See also
Camera (disambiguation)
Camara (disambiguation)
Camras, a surname